The Chicago, Milwaukee and St. Paul Freight House is a historic former railway station in Stillwater, Minnesota, United States, built in 1883 as a passenger and freight depot for the Chicago, Milwaukee and St. Paul Railway (better known as the Milwaukee Road).  It was listed on the National Register of Historic Places in 1977 for having local significance in the themes of commerce, communications, engineering, and transportation.  Its notability derives in part from its long service to Stillwater; nearly all goods shipped to and from the city passed through this station, and up to the 1920s it hosted critical telegraph and Railway Express Agency offices.  The building is also noted as a somewhat rare example of a combination freight and passenger station, and for the engineering of its internal wood construction.  It is also a contributing property to the Stillwater Commercial Historic District.  The station closed in 1970 and now houses the Freight House Restaurant.

History
The predecessor of the Milwaukee Road was the Stillwater and Hastings Railway, which was established in 1880 to connect Stillwater to Hastings, Minnesota.  The Stillwater and Hastings Railway only completed  of track before being acquired by the Milwaukee Road in 1882, which completed the construction.

During this period in the 1880s, Stillwater was a busy trade center, handling traffic from miners and trappers from the north of town and from farmers and lumbermen from the west. The Milwaukee Road built the freight house in 1883, and it soon handled more than 70 railcars per day. The heavy ceiling trusses supported a full slate roof.

The freight house operated through 1970, when the Milwaukee Road closed it.  It was listed on the National Register of Historic Places in 1977, making it the first building in Stillwater so listed.  In 1992 much of downtown Stillwater was listed on the National Register as a historic district, with the Freight House as a contributing property.

See also
 National Register of Historic Places listings in Washington County, Minnesota

References

External links
 The Freight House Restaurant

Former railway stations in Minnesota
Individually listed contributing properties to historic districts on the National Register in Minnesota
National Register of Historic Places in Washington County, Minnesota
Railway buildings and structures on the National Register of Historic Places in Minnesota
Railway freight houses on the National Register of Historic Places
Railway stations on the National Register of Historic Places in Minnesota
Railway stations in the United States opened in 1883
Railway stations closed in 1970
Restaurants in Minnesota
Stillwater
Stillwater, Minnesota
Transportation buildings and structures in Washington County, Minnesota
Vernacular architecture in Minnesota